Senzokuhle Radebe (born 29 May 1993) is a South African actor best known for his supporting role as Sthembiso “Sthe” Gumede on the SABC2 soap opera Muvhango, Abednego on Isono, as  well as his role as Zibuko on Gomora.

Early life 
Radebe has always been fascinated by the acting scene, however, it was only in Grade 10 that he made the decision to take Dramatic Arts as one of his subjects at school.

Career 
After auditioning for the role of Vusi (Thandaza Mokoena's son) on Muvhango, Radebe went through eight callbacks and didn't get the role, but got called back for a different character which was created specifically for him.

After finishing matric at Alexandra High School, he decided to attend Duma Ndlovu Academy at Joburg Theatre in enhancing acting skill since acting was his first love.

Radebe has made appearances and secured a lead role on SABC1 Ingozi and getting a gig on Mzansi Magic's Abomama Bomthandazo are the biggest highlights for Senzo, but the actor plans on starting his own production company at a later stage in his career.

Filmography

References 

1993 births
Living people
South African male soap opera actors
21st-century South African male actors